George II, Prince of Waldeck and Pyrmont (20 September 178915 May 1845) was Prince of Waldeck and Pyrmont from 1813 to 1845.

He was the son of George I, Prince of Waldeck and Pyrmont and Countess Princess Augusta of Schwarzburg-Sondershausen.

Marriage and children
He married Emma, daughter of Victor II, Prince of Anhalt-Bernburg-Schaumburg-Hoym, and Princess Amalie of Nassau-Weilburg, in Schaumburg on 26 June 1823 . They had three sons and two daughters:

Princess Augusta of Waldeck-Pyrmont  (21 July 1824 – 4 September 1893), married Alfred, Prince of Stolberg-Stolberg, had issue.
Prince Josef of Waldeck and Pyrmont (24 November 1825 – 27 December 1829)
Princess Hermine of Waldeck and Pyrmont (29 September 1827 – 16 February 1910), married Adolf I, Prince of Schaumburg-Lippe, had issue.
George Victor, Prince of Waldeck and Pyrmont (14 January 1831 – 12 May 1893), married (1) Princess Helena of Nassau, had issue, (2) married Princess Louise of Schleswig-Holstein-Sonderburg-Glücksburg, had issue.
Prince Wolrad of Waldeck and Pyrmont (24 January 1833 – 20 January 1867)

Ancestry

Notes and sources

thePeerage.com - Georg II Prinz zu Waldeck und Pyrmont
Georg Heinrich zu Waldeck und Pyrmont (German)
Karl Theodor Menke: Pyrmont und seine Umgebung. Hameln, Pyrmont, 1840, S.65
L. Curtze: Geschichte und Beschreibung des Fürstentums Waldeck. Arolsen, 1850, S.619f.

1789 births
1845 deaths
People from Lörrach (district)
People from Waldeck (state)
Princes of Waldeck and Pyrmont
House of Waldeck and Pyrmont